"More" is a song by The Sisters of Mercy, from their album Vision Thing. It was the first single from the album, reaching number one on the Billboard Modern Rock Tracks chart for five weeks, starting 15 December 1990. The song was co-written and co-produced by Andrew Eldritch and Jim Steinman.

It was covered by Shaaman on their album Reason, and Gregorian for their album The Dark Side. Steinman produced a cover of the song, by Mike Vogel and Erika Christensen, for the soundtrack of the MTV film Wuthering Heights. He also used the song's main guitar riff and the "I need all the love I can get" vocal in a song for his musical Batman.

The song was also re-recorded by Meat Loaf for his 2016 album Braver Than We Are.

Track listing
"More" written by Andrew Eldritch and Jim Steinman, "You Could Be the One" written by Andreas Bruhn and Eldritch.

Charts

Meat Loaf version

The song was re-recorded by Meat Loaf on his 2016 album Braver Than We Are.  It was not issued as a single for the album.

See also
Number one modern rock hits of 1990
Number one modern rock hits of 1991

References

1990 singles
1990 songs
The Sisters of Mercy songs
Meat Loaf songs
Songs written by Jim Steinman
Music videos directed by Dominic Sena
Songs written by Andrew Eldritch
Song recordings produced by Jim Steinman
Song recordings with Wall of Sound arrangements